John Banovetz is a chemist, materials scientist and former managing director of 3M. Since 2021, he has been a member of the President’s Council of Advisors on Science and Technology (PCAST).

Career
Banovetz is head of chemical manufacturing at 3M, where he oversees more than 8,000 researchers world-wide. He was also the managing director of 3M in Germany, Austria and Switzerland.

He is a trustee of the Science Museum of Minnesota, as well as the Hamline University. He also holds multiple patents for various adhesives and polymer science.

References

Living people
Hamline University alumni
3M people
Year of birth missing (living people)